This is a list of tennis players who have represented the Switzerland Davis Cup team in an official Davis Cup match. Switzerland have taken part in the competition since 1923.

Players

References

Lists of Davis Cup tennis players
Davis Cup